is a private university in Takatsuki, Osaka, Japan. The predecessor of the school was founded in 1904, and it was chartered as a university in 1950.

External links
 

Educational institutions established in 1904
Educational institutions disestablished in 2021
Private universities and colleges in Japan
Universities and colleges in Osaka Prefecture
1904 establishments in Japan
2021 disestablishments in Japan
Defunct private universities and colleges in Japan